Dimitrios Angelopoulos (born 14 December 1993) is a Greek professional footballer who plays as a goalkeeper for Swedish club Härnösands FF.

References
 Dimitrios Angelopoulos at Soccerway.com
 Dimitrios Angelopoulos " at FLnews.gr"

1993 births
Living people
Iraklis Psachna F.C. players
Härnösands FF players
Greek expatriate footballers
Expatriate footballers in Sweden
Association football goalkeepers
Footballers from Athens
Greek footballers